The Immediate Geographic Region of Oliveira is one of the 6 immediate geographic regions in the Intermediate Geographic Region of Divinópolis, one of the 70 immediate geographic regions in the Brazilian state of Minas Gerais and one of the 509 of Brazil, created by the National Institute of Geography and Statistics (IBGE) in 2017.

Municipalities 
It comprises 10 municipalities.

 Bonfim   
 Carmópolis de Minas  
 Crucilândia    
 Itaguara    
 Oliveira 
 Passa Tempo 
 Piedade dos Gerais   
 Piracema  
 Rio Manso   
 São Francisco de Paula

See also 

 List of Intermediate and Immediate Geographic Regions of Minas Gerais

References 

Geography of Minas Gerais